Ilyas Ahmed Bilour is a Pakistani politician who has been a member of Senate of Pakistan, since March 2012.

Education
He holds a degree of Bachelor of Arts which he received from the University of Karachi in 1969. He also holds the degree of Master of Business Administration in Marketing which he obtained from Al-Khair University in 1999.

Political career
He was elected to the Senate of Pakistan as a candidate of Awami National Party in 2012 Pakistani Senate election.

References

Living people
Pakistani senators (14th Parliament)
Awami National Party politicians
Year of birth missing (living people)